The Governor of East Kalimantan is the executive head of the Indonesian province of East Kalimantan. The office was created in 1956, shortly before the formation of East Kalimantan as a new province on January 1, 1957.

List of governors
This is a list of governors since the province's creation in 1957.

<onlyinclude>

Note

Referensi 

East Kalimantan